Emigrante is the follow-up to the well-received début album, A Lo Cubano, by the Cuban hip hop band Orishas. The album was released  on June 11, 2002,  after Flaco-Pro left the band.

Track listing
"¿Que Pasa?" – 3:41
"Mujer" – 3:49
"Guajiro" – 3:19
"Que Bola" – 4:21
"Asi Fue" – 3:49
"Niños" – 3:49
"300 Kilos" – 4:05
"Gladiadores" – 4:05
"Ausencia" – 3:35
"Habana" – 3:38
"Testimonio" – 4:38
"El Rey De La Pachacha" – 4:09
"Emigrantes" – 3:45
"Desaparecidos" – 3:49
"La Vida Pasa" – 3:47

Charts

Weekly charts

Year-end charts

Certifications

References

Orishas (band) albums
2002 albums
Latin Grammy Award for Best Urban Music Album